André Thieme (born April 25, 1975) is a German rider who competes in show jumping.

André Thieme was born as the son of Michael Thieme, a dressage rider and “Obersattelmeister” of the state stud in Redefin. At the age of 19, he received the “Goldene Reitabzeichen”, a mention for ten victories in dressage competitions on high level of difficulty. Thenceforth he focused riding show jumping competitions.

Thieme is a professional show jumping rider and master horse farm manager (“Pferdewirtschaftsmeister“). In 2007 he was second at the championship of the German professional show jumping riders. In 2009 and 2010 Thieme was the most successful rider of Mecklenburg-Vorpommern. He was several times part of German Nation Cup teams in Eastern Europe and North America.

He lives in Plau am See in the north-east of Germany together with his wife and his son; his horses lives in a stable in Leizen near Röbel since April 2012. Since 2010 Thieme has much success at horse shows in big horse shows in North America, where he lives some months in the year.

The first main success in the career of André Theime was his victory in the 78th German show jumping derby in Hamburg. He was the second rider from the former German Democratic Republic (after Holger Wulschner in the year 2000) who win this competition. The Derby is a world-famous show jumping competition over special natural fences. In 2008 he won the derby a second time, in 2011 a third time.

His probably biggest success in his career so far was the win of the 2011 $1,000,000 Grand Prix in Saugerties, New York. For this event he had qualified in spring at national tournaments in Florida. In March 2014 he win the Great American $1 Million Grand Prix at Ocala, Florida riding Contanga. In the years 2015 to 2017, Thieme and his gelding Conthendrix was several times part of German Nations Cup teams.

During his annual stay in Florida André Thieme win End of March 2021 the final Grand Prix of the Ocala Winter Circuit, riding Chakaria. With this victory Thieme was the first rider was the first rider who won four $1,000,000 Grand Prix organized by HITS, Inc. in his career. Even after returning to Europe, the 2021 season was highly successful for him: He was nominated for two of the four Nations Cups of the Europe Division of the FEI Nations Cup series with Chakaria and was also victorious with his other horses, for example in the Herzlake Grand Prix. In early July 2021 he was nominated for the Summer Olympics in Tokyo.

He was part of the silver winning German team at the European Championships 2021 in Riesenbeck, Germany with Chakaria. With just 2.84 penalties after three rounds, he was the best rider of the German team. With one clear round and four penalties in the final competition André Thieme and Chakaria won the individual gold medal.

Horses

Current 
 Chakaria (born 2010), chestnut mare, German sport horse, sire: Chap, sire of dam: Askari
 Conacco (born 2011), bay gelding, Oldenburg show jumping horse, sire: Conoglio, sire of dam: Chacco-Blue
 Cupertino (born 2008), bay stallion, Holsteiner, sire: Contender, sire of dam: Leonce
 Liratus (born 2005), bay gelding, Danish Warmblood, sire: Corratus, sire of dam: Limebrand

Former sport horses 
 Cellestial (born 1994), grey stallion, Oldenburg horse sire: Cantus; first ridden in sport by Heiko Schmidt, up to beginning 2005 ridden by Rolf-Göran Bengtsson, then ridden by Jan Peters, from Autumn 2005 to beginning 2006 ridden by Rene Tebbel, 2006 ridden by André Thieme, in 2008 ridden by Katrin Schmidt, today breeding sire
 Nacorde (born 1995), brown gelding, Dutch Warmblood, sire: Concorde, retired from sport in 2012
 Magnus (born 1996), chestnut gelding, sire: Matador, since January 2010 ridden by Andrew Coolen
 Antares F (born 2000), grey gelding, Württemberger, sire: Araconit, since July 2010 ridden by McLain Ward
 Aragon Rouet (born 2000, former “Aragon ter Spelonck”), dark brown gelding, Belgian Warmblood, sire: Baloubet du Rouet, since autumn 2011 ridden by Meg O'Mara
 Katie Riddle (born 2000), grey mare, Brandenburger, sire: Kolibri, since 2010 ridden by John McConnell
 Coco (born 2001), dark brown gelding, Mecklenburger, sire: Cellestial, at the World Breeding Jumping Championships for young horses and in 2011 ridden by André Thieme, up to 2010 ridden by Heiko Schmidt, since then owned and ridden by Seth Vallhonrat, since May 2011 ridden by McLain Ward
 Uvalier (born 2001), brown gelding, Belgian Warmblood, sire: Cavalier, in Spring 2011 sold to Canada
 Caesar (born 2002), chestnut gelding, stud book of Zangersheide, sire: Canabis Z, since 2012 ridden by Christi Israel
 Contanga (born 2004), bay mare, Oldenburg Show Jumping horse, sire: Catoki, sold in summer 2015 to Athina Onassis
 Conthendrix (born 2004), grey gelding, Holsteiner, sire: Contendro, sire of dam: Cor de la Bryère; Ridden by Mary Looke from 2018
 Voigtsdorfs Quonschbob (born 2004, former name: Querly P), dark bay gelding, Oldenburg Show Jumping horse, sire: Querlybet Hero

Results (since 2005)

International Championships 

 2021:
 Olympic Games, Tokyo, Japan: 9. place team and 31. place individual
 European Championships, Riesenbeck, Germany: team silver medal and individual gold medal

Other major results 

 2021:
 Grand Prix of Klein Roscharden (CSI 2*): 4th place with Conacco
 Nations Cup of Sopot (CSIO 5*): 1st place with Chakaria
 Grand Prix of St. Gallen (CSIO 5*): 4th place with Chakaria
 Nations Cup of St. Gallen (CSIO 5*): 2nd place with Chakaria
 CSI 2* Grand Prix of Herzlake-Gut Einhaus: 1st place with Conacco
 Grand Prix of Redefin (CSI 2*): 2nd place with Chakaria
 Great American $1 Million Grand Prix of Ocala: 1st place with Chakaria
 200.000 US-$-Grand Prix of Ocala / HITS IX: 3rd place with Crazy Girl
 Grand Prix of the 8th week of the Winter Equestrian Festival at Wellington FL (CSIO 4*): 2nd place with Chakaria
 150.000 US-$ Grand Prix of Ocala / HITS VI: 1st place with Crazy Girl
 200.000 US-$ Grand Prix of Ocala / HITS V: 3rd place with Crazy Girl
 150.000 US-$ Grand Prix of Ocala / HITS IV: 1st place with Conacco
 75.000 US-$ Grand Prix of the World Equestrian Ocala Winter Spectacular Nr. 6: 3rd place with Chakaria
 2020:
 200.000 US-$ Grand Prix of Ocala / HITS V: 3rd place with Cellisto
 Grand Prix of Dorfchemnitz (national class): 2nd place with Contadur
 Nations Cup of Praha (CSIO 3*): 4th place with Chakaria
 German show jumping championship at Riesenbeck: 5th place with Chakaria
 2019:
 50.000 US-$ Grand Prix of Ocala / HITS VI: 3rd place with Cupertino
 World cup leg of Ocala (CSI 3*-W Live Oak International): 2nd place with Aretino
 Championship of Hamburg (CSI 5*): 3rd place with Crazy Girl V
 Grand Prix of Werder (Havel) (national class): 1st place with Aretino
 Falsterbo Derby at CSIO 5* Falsterbo: 1st place with Contadur
 Grand Prix of Görlitz (national class): 2nd place with Contadur
 Grand Prix of Gadebusch (national class): 3rd place with Contadur
 Grand Prix of Sachsen (Chemnitz, national class) 2nd place with Liratus
 2018:
 CSI 3* Grand Prix of Ocala / HITS VI: 2nd place with Cupertino
 50.000 US-$ Grand Prix of Ocala / HITS VII: 3rd place with Cupertino
 Grand Prix of Mühlengeez (national class): 1st place with Aretino
 Nations Cup of Calgary at the CSIO Spruce Meadows 'Masters' Tournament (CSIO 5*): 1st place with Aretino
 Grand Prix of Forst (Lausitz) (national class): 1st place with Contadur
 Grand Prix of Saxony (Chemnitz, national class): 1st place with Aretino
 2017:
 CSI 2*-Grand Prix of Ocala / HITS VI: 3rd place with Conthendrix
 World cup leg of Ocala (CSI 3*-W Live Oak International): 2nd place with Conthendrix
 AIG $1 Million Grand Prix of Thermal: 4th place with Conthendrix
 Great American $1 Million Grand Prix of Ocala: 3rd place with Conthendrix
 Nations Cup of Lummen (CSIO 5*): 1st place with Conthendrix
 Nations Cup of St. Gallen (CSIO 5*): 3rd place with Conthendrix
 State championship of Mecklenburg-Vorpommern: 3rd place with Cupertino
 Nations Cup of Falsterbo (CSIO 5*): 2nd place with Conthendrix
 Grand Prix of Mühlengeez (national class): 1st place with Contadur
 1,000,000 US-$-Grand Prix of Saugerties (CSI 5*): 1st place with Conthendrix
 2016:
 50,000 US-$-Grand Prix of Ocala / HITS VI: 2nd place with Cellisto
 50,000 US-$-Grand Prix of Ocala / HITS VIII: 2nd place with Conthendrix
 87th German show jumping derby (CSI 3* Hamburg): 3rd place with Quonschbob
 Nations Cup of Falsterbo (CSIO 5*): no faults in both rounds with Conthendrix
 Grand Prix of Aschersleben: 2nd place with Liratus
 Grand Prix of Paderborn (CSI 3*): 3rd place with Conthendrix
 Grand Prix of Saxonia at Chemnitz: 2nd place with Liratus
 World cup leg of Poznań (CSI 3*-W): 2nd place with Conthendrix
 2016 Riders Tour season ranking: 2nd place
 2015:
 Grand Prix at the CSIO 4* Ocala: 3rd place with Conthendrix
 50,000 US-$-Grand Prix of Ocala / HITS VI: 2nd place with Conthendrix
 Grand Prix of Redefin (CSI 3*): 3rd place with Ramona de Flobecq
 86th German show jumping derby (CSI 3* Hamburg): 2nd place with Quonschbob
 Nations Cup of Sopot (CSIO 5*): 1st place with Conthendrix
 Grand Prix of Aachen (CSI 5*): 7th place with Contanga
 German show jumping championships at Balve: 13th place with Conthendrix
 Grand Prix of Groß Viegeln (CSI 3*): 3rd place with Conthendrix
 2014:
 $1,000,000 Grand Prix in Ocala (Florida) / HITS X: 1st place with Contanga
 Grand Prix of Forst (Lausitz), 2nd place with Conthendrix
 German show jumping championships at Balve: 12th place (with Conthendrix) and 13th place (with Contanga)
 Nations Cup of Falsterbo (CSIO 5*): 1st place with Conthendrix
 Grand Prix of Falsterbo (CSIO 5*) 2nd place with Contanga
 Nations Cup of Hickstead (CSIO 5*): 2nd place with Contanga
 Nations Cup of Porto Alegre (CSIO 4*): 2nd place with Ramona de Flobecq
 2013:
 $50,000 Grand Prix in Ocala (Florida) / HITS IV: 2nd place with Catharina
 $50,000 Grand Prix in Ocala (Florida) / HITS VI: 2nd place with Quonschbob
 Nations Cup of Wellington FL (CSIO 4*): 3rd place with Contanga
 $100,000 Grand Prix in Ocala (Florida) / HITS IX: 1st place with Contanga
 Grand Prix of Gijon (CSIO 5*): 1st place with Contanga
 2012:
 $25,000 Grand Prix in Ocala (Florida) / HITS II : 1st place with Caesar
 Championat of Redefin (Germany, CSI 2*): 1st place with Nacorde
 2011:
 $1,000,000 Grand Prix in Saugerties (New York): 1st place with Aragon Rouet
 Show jumping championship of Mecklenburg-Vorpommern, Sukow: 2nd place
 82nd German show jumping derby in Hamburg: 1st place with Nacorde
 Grand Prix of Redefin (Germany, CSI 2*): 1st place with Aragon Rouet
 $100,000 Grand Prix in Ocala (Florida) / HITS VI: 3rd place with Coco
 $50,000 Grand Prix in Ocala (Florida) / HITS V: 1st place with Coco
 $50,000 Grand Prix in Ocala (Florida) / HITS II : 1st place with Caesar, 3rd place with Uvalier
 2010:
 Show jumping championship of Mecklenburg-Vorpommern, Sukow: 1st place
 $1,000,000 Grand Prix in Saugerties (New York): 9th place with Aragon Rouet
 British Jumping Derby (CSI 4*): 3rd place with Nacorde
 Nations Cup of Poland, Sopot (CSIO 3*): 1st place as part of the German team with Aragon Rouet
 $100,000 Grand Prix of Devon (Pennsylvania): 3rd place with Antares F
 $300,000 Grand Prix in Thermal (California): 5th place with Aragon Rouet
 $75,000 Grand Prix in Ocala (Florida): 1st place with Caesar, 3rd place with Aragon Rouet
 Nations Cup of United States, Wellington FL (CSIO 4*): 5th place as part of the German team with Antares F
 2009:
 Grand Prix of Redefin (Germany, CSI 2*): 1st place with Katie Riddle
 80th German show jumping derby in Hamburg: 3rd place with Nacorde
 Nations Cup of Poland, Sopot (CSIO 3*): 3rd place as part of the German team with Katie Riddle
 2008:
 79th German show jumping derby in Hamburg: 1st place with Nacorde
 Nations Cup of Poland, Poznań (CSIO 4*): 4th place as part of the German team with Nacorde
 2007:
 78th German show jumping derby in Hamburg: 1st place with Nacorde
 German championship of the professional show jumping riders, Bad Oeynhausen: 2nd place
 Swedish show jumping derby, Falsterbo (CSIO 5*): 2nd place with Nacorde
 Indoor show jumping championship of Mecklenburg-Vorpommern, Redefin: 1st place with Magnus
 2006:
 Nations Cup of Hungary, Kiskunhalas (CSIO 4*-W): 1st place as part of the German team with  Cellestial
 77th German show jumping derby in Hamburg: 2nd place with Nacorde
 World Breeding Jumping Championships for young horses, Zangersheide (Belgium) – Five-year-old horses championship: 3rd place with Coco
 2005:
 Nations Cup of Estonia, Tallinn (CSIO 4*-W): 1st place as part of the German team

External links 

 web page of André Thieme

References 

1975 births
Living people
People from Plau am See
People from Bezirk Schwerin
German show jumping riders
German male equestrians
Sportspeople from Mecklenburg-Western Pomerania
Equestrians at the 2020 Summer Olympics
Olympic equestrians of Germany